Tabuelan, officially the Municipality of Tabuelan, is a 4th class municipality in the province of Cebu, Philippines. According to the 2020 census, it has a population of 28,907 people.

Tabuelan is bordered to the north by the town of San Remigio, to the west is the Tañon Strait, to the east are the towns of Borbon and Sogod, and to the south is the town of Tuburan.

History
The Municipality of Tabuelan used to be a barangay of Tuburan until the 1950s and it was also Tuburan's largest Barangay at the time. In fact, all of its constituent barangays were once barrio of then Barangay Tabuelan. In 1953, Tabuelan was separated via a Philippine Law from its mother municipality of Tuburan, on the grounds that Barangay Tabuelan is far from the administrative center of Tuburan (Poblacion Tuburan) and hence, it was not able to properly maintain and address the needs of the people in that barangay. Tuburan opposed such partition but when the law was upheld, it humbly gave way and followed the mandate of the law to avoid economic repercussions. Hence, being formally established as a full-fledged Municipality in 1953, makes Tabuelan, the newest and youngest municipality in Cebu Island.

Geography

Barangays
Tabuelan comprises 12 barangays:

Climate

Demographics

Economy

Transportation
V-Hire, Ceres Liner and Mini Buses are among the PUVs going to the town. They mostly bypass here for their Main Routes are either San Remigio or Tuburan.

References

External links
 [ Philippine Standard Geographic Code]

Municipalities of Cebu